Nordiq Canada is the governing federation for cross-country skiing in Canada.

History
The first governing body for cross-country skiing in Canada was the Canadian Amateur Skiers Association (CASA), founded in 1920. This body covered all disciplines of skiing; alpine, cross-country, and jumping. CASA changed to Canadian Skiers Association (CSA) and in 1969 cross-country skiing separated from the CSA, becoming its own discipline. Biathlon was part of the CCC for 9 years until it left and formed its own governing body. The CCC remains Canada's governing body for cross-country skiing.

In 2019, Cross Country Ski de Fond Canada officially rebranded and is now known as Nordiq Canada.

See also
 Canadian Snowboard Federation, Canadian snowboard sports federation
 Canadian Freestyle Ski Association, Canadian freestyle skiing sports federation
 Nordic Combined Ski Canada, Canadian Nordic combined skiing sports federation
 Ski Jumping Canada, Canadian ski jumping sports federation
 Alpine Canada, Canadian alpine skiing sports federation
 Biathlon Canada, Canadian biathlon ski-shooting sports federation

External links

Cross-country skiing
Cross-country skiing in Canada
Cross-country skiing organizations
Sports organizations established in 1969
1969 establishments in Canada